Talmas is a commune in the Somme department in Hauts-de-France in northern France.

Geography

Population

Places of interest
Known for the « muches », a vast network of natural and man-made galleries in the limestone, where the local population hid and lived during the Spanish occupation in the 16th century.

See also
Communes of the Somme department

References

External links

 Official website of the commune 
 The Muches  

Communes of Somme (department)